Palizzolo Gravina, baron of Ramione, was an Italian heraldic writer. His work Il Blasone in Sicilia, edited In Palermo in 1871-1875, contains over 2,000 coats of arms of Sicilian families and is important for the study of Sicilian aristocracy.

Barons of Italy
19th-century Italian writers
19th-century non-fiction writers
19th-century Italian male writers
Male non-fiction writers